Angel Morán Benavides was a Cuban baseball second baseman in the Cuban League. He played with several teams from 1902 to 1908, including Club Fé, San Francisco, and Carmelita. He also played for Nuevo Criollo during the 1904 Cuban-American Major League Clubs Series.

References

External links

Year of birth missing
Cuban League players
Cuban baseball players
Club Fé players
Carmelita players
San Francisco (baseball) players
Year of death unknown